Admiral Wright may refer to:

Carleton H. Wright (1892–1973), U.S. Navy rear admiral
Garland Wright (born 1954), U.S. Navy rear admiral
Jerauld Wright (1898–1995), U.S. Navy admiral
Royston Wright (1908–1977), British Royal Navy admiral
Thomas Charles Wright (1799–1868), Irish-born Ecuadorian Navy admiral